Kane County is a county in the U.S. state of Utah. As of the 2010 United States Census, the population was 7,125. Its county seat and largest city is Kanab.

History
The county was created on January 16, 1864, by the Utah Territory legislature, with areas partitioned from Washington County. It was named for Col. Thomas L. Kane, a friend of the Latter Day Saint settlers in the 1840s and 1850s. The county boundary was adjusted in 1869, when a portion was returned to Washington County; in 1880, when San Juan County was created; and in 1883, when portions were partitioned from Kane and added to Iron and Washington counties.

Geography
Kane County lies on the south line of the state of Utah. Its south border abuts the northern border of the state of Arizona. The Colorado River, reformed as Lake Powell, forms its eastern border. Grand Staircase–Escalante National Monument covers much of the county. A rugged and inhospitable country of deserts, mountains, and cliffs make up the terrain, with breathtaking scenery in every area. Parts of Bryce Canyon National Park and Zion National Park extend into the northern and western portions of the county. The eastern part of the county is part of the Glen Canyon National Recreation Area.

Adjacent counties

 Washington County - west
 Iron County - northwest
 Garfield County - north
 San Juan County - east
 Mohave County, Arizona - southwest
 Coconino County, Arizona - south

Protected areas

 Bryce Canyon National Park (part)
 Coral Pink Sand Dunes State Park
 Dixie National Forest (part)
 Glen Canyon National Recreation Area (part)
 Grand Staircase–Escalante National Monument (part)
 Kodachrome Basin State Park
 Zion National Park (part)

Lakes
 Lake Powell (along east border)
 Navajo Lake

Demographics

2000 census
As of the 2000 United States Census, there were 6,046 people, 2,237 households, and 1,628 families in the county. The population density was 1.52/sqmi (0.59/km2). There were 3,767 housing units at an average density of 0.94/sqmi (0.36/km2). The racial makeup of the county was 96.00% White, 0.03% Black or African American, 1.55% Native American, 0.22% Asian, 0.05% Pacific Islander, 0.74% from other races, and 1.41% from two or more races. 2.32% of the population were Hispanic or Latino of any race. The top 5 ethnic groups in Kane County are:
 English-30%
 German-10%
 Irish-9%
 Danish-5%
 Swedish-4%

There were 2,237 households, of which 32.20% had children under 18 living with them, 64.60% were married couples living together, 6.00% had a female householder with no husband present, and 27.20% were non-families. 23.30% of all households were made up of individuals, and 10.20% had someone living alone who was 65 years of age or older. The average household size was 2.67, and the average family size was 3.21.

The county population contained 29.40% under the age of 18, 6.80% from 18 to 24, 21.20% from 25 to 44, 25.90% from 45 to 64, and 16.70% who were 65 years of age or older. The median age was 39 years. For every 100 females, there were 98.30 males. For every 100 females aged 18 and over, there were 94.10 males.

The median income for a household in the county was $34,247, and the median income for a family was $40,030. Males had a median income of $30,655 versus $20,406 for females. The per capita income for the county was $15,455. About 5.50% of families and 7.90% of the population were below the poverty line, including 9.30% of those under age 18 and 5.40% of those aged 65 or over.

Politics and Government
Kane is one of the most reliably Republican counties in the nation. Of "straight-ticket" voters in the 2008 election, there were 992 Republicans and 326 Democrats. In the Utah gubernatorial election, 2004 nearly 70% of the county's vote went for Jon Huntsman, Jr. and in the 2008 election he received around 75% of the vote. Kane County is part of Utah's 2nd congressional district and thus was represented by moderate Democrat Jim Matheson for several years until 2013. The second district is now represented by Republican Chris Stewart, elected in 2012 when Jim Matheson ran for election to the newly created fourth district instead of remaining in the second.

In Presidential elections, Kane County has only been won once by a Democratic candidate when Woodrow Wilson carried the county in 1916. It was the only county in Utah carried by Alf Landon, the Republican opponent who lost to Franklin Delano Roosevelt in the 1936 Presidential election in the most lopsided Presidential election in over a century. It has solidly favored the Republican candidate since at least 1956, when Dwight D. Eisenhower received approximately 90% of the vote. In 1964 the county went for Barry Goldwater, who lost the overall in the state by over thirty-nine percent. Since 1920, only in the Democratic landslides of 1936, 1940, and 1964 did the Democratic candidate for president receive even 30% of the county's vote.

Communities

City
 Kanab (county seat)

Towns
 Alton
 Big Water
 Glendale
 Orderville

Unincorporated communities
 Bullfrog
 Duck Creek Village
 Mount Carmel
 Mount Carmel Junction

Ghost towns
 Johnson
 Paria

See also
 National Register of Historic Places listings in Kane County, Utah

References

External links
 Kane County official website

 
1864 establishments in Utah Territory
Populated places established in 1864